The North Island robin (Petroica longipes) is a species of Australasian robin endemic to the North Island of New Zealand. It is also known in Māori as the Toutouwai. It and the South Island robin (P. australis) of the South Island and Stewart Island were once considered conspecific (and called the "New Zealand robin"), but mitochondrial DNA sequences have shown that the two lineages split prior to the Pleistocene, and support the classification as two different species.

Description

The plumage is dark grey-black overall, with a pale area (smaller than that of the South Island robin) on the belly and breast, and pale streaking on the upperparts. They are sexually dimorphic, with males having darker plumage than the females and being slightly larger.

Distribution and habitat
The North Island robin is distributed mostly in the centre of the North Island, with small relict populations in the north and south, on Moturua Island in the Bay of Islands, Little Barrier Island, and Kapiti Island. Populations have been reestablished in the Zealandia  sanctuary in Wellington, and at Moehau on the Coromandel Peninsula. A remnant population is also reestablishing itself in the Ōhope Scenic Reserve, near Whakatāne; 40 birds were translocated to the reserve from Mokoia Island to assist the population there.

Their natural habitat is mostly native forest, particularly Podocarpus and southern beech (Nothofagaceae) forests, from sea level up to the tree-line.

Behaviour

Feeding
The North Island robin, like the South Island robin, is a terrestrial feeder foraging on or near the ground (unlike the related and more arboreal tomtit). Prey items are located by perch-hunting, where an individual waits at an elevated perch until prey is spotted, or by active searching; prey is taken from the leaf-litter, low vegetation (branches and foliage), and tree trunks. Numerous invertebrate prey are taken, including cicadas, earthworms, wētā, snails, and spiders. Fruit is also taken. North Island robins cache food supplies for later when prey is plentiful, although males cache more food than females do. Both sexes will steal food from their mate's cache, and are less likely to cache food, if their mate is present.

Gallery

References

North Island robin
Birds of the North Island
North Island robin
North Island robin
Endemic birds of New Zealand